Long Reach is an unincorporated community in Tyler County, West Virginia, United States.

Long Reach is located along a  relatively straight portion stretch of the Ohio River. This is the longest and straightest stretch of the entire river.

References

Unincorporated communities in Tyler County, West Virginia
Unincorporated communities in West Virginia
West Virginia populated places on the Ohio River